Sahakyan's government was the governing body of Artsakh from 25 September 2017 to 21 May 2020. It is the first cabinet after constitutional referendum in 2017, after which the country was transitioned from a semi-presidential system to a presidential system. As a result, presidential elections were delayed until 2020 in order to be held alongside legislative elections. In July 2017 the National Assembly elected the President for the next three years until the general election. 28 members of National Assembly voted for Bako Sahakyan, 4 of them voted for Eduard Aghabekyan, while one of the MPs did not vote for any of the candidates.

This was a coalition government formed by three parliamentary groups: Free Motherland, Armenian Revolutionary Federation, and Democratic Party.

The structure of the government of Artsakh consists of twelve ministries and three other bodies. Each ministry is responsible for elaborating and implementing governmental decisions in its respective sphere.

Structure

References 

European governments
Cabinets established in 2017
Executive branch of the government of the Republic of Artsakh